No. 512 Squadron was a Second World War Royal Air Force transport squadron.

History
No. 512 Squadron was formed on 18 June 1943 from the Dakota element of 24 Squadron at RAF Hendon. It operated on supply routes from the United Kingdom to Gibraltar and Algeria to support the campaign in North West Africa. It also flew internal routes within the United Kingdom, and to the Azores and India. In February 1944 the squadron changed role and was transferred to No. 46 Group at RAF Broadwell; it was now a tactical Dakota squadron and started training glider towing and parachute dropping. Its first operation in the new role was a leaflet drop on 5 June 1944 over France, this followed intensive flying in and out of France including dropping parachutists at Arnhem. In fact, 512 Squadron can claim that they were the first planes over on D-Day as three Dakotas piloted by Fl Lt Hyde, W.O. James Proctor and a C Flight Flying Officer dropped a specialist team at 00.02 on 6 June to try to disrupt the Merville Battery before the main assault. It suffered losses during Operation Market Garden and was withdrawn to operate a transport service from Brussels in March 1945, although it was still involved in airborne operations associated with the Rhine crossing. After VE Day in July 1945 it extended its trooping routes to Palestine and the Middle East and moved to RAF Qastina in Palestine in October 1945, moving on by the end of the month to Gianaclis near Alexandria, Egypt. In December 1945 it moved to Bari, to operate scheduled flights within Italy. It returned to the United Kingdom in February 1946 and was disbanded upon arrival on 14 March 1946.

Aircraft operated

Squadron bases

Commanding officers

See also
List of Royal Air Force aircraft squadrons

References

Notes

Bibliography

 The Illustrated Encyclopedia of Aircraft, (Part Work 1982–1985), Orbis Publishing

External links
 Squadron histories for nos. 500–520 sqn

Military units and formations established in 1943
512 Squadron
Aircraft squadrons of the Royal Air Force in World War II
Transport units and formations of the Royal Air Force 
Military units and formations in Mandatory Palestine in World War II